The Mubarraz class is a class of two fast attack craft built for the United Arab Emirates Navy in the late 1980s and commissioned in 1990. They have four MM 40 Exocet anti-ship missiles, a Sadral SAM launcher and a 76mm gun. As of 2013 both vessels remain in service.

Units

 P141 Mubarraz
 P142 Makasib

Ships of the United Arab Emirates Navy